Martin Sus (born 8 May 1989) is a Czech football player who currently plays for 1. SK Prostějov. He has represented his country at youth level.

References

External links

 Profile at FC Zbrojovka Brno official site

1989 births
Living people
Czech footballers
Czech Republic youth international footballers
Czech First League players
FC Zbrojovka Brno players
Footballers from Brno
Association football defenders
Czech National Football League players
SK Líšeň players
1. SK Prostějov players